Charles Dewayne Byrd Jr. (born October 11, 1983) is an American retired mixed martial artist. A professional from 2009 until 2020, Byrd competed in the Ultimate Fighting Championship and Legacy FC.

Background
Byrd was born in Pine Bluff, Arkansas, and grew up in Texas. He attended Arlington High School and competed in wrestling and played football during his high school years.

Mixed martial arts career

Early career
After a 2–0 amateur career, Byrd began his professional career in 2009 and fought under various promotions, notably Legacy Fighting Championship. He amassed a record of 7–4 before joined Dana White's Contender Series.

Dana White's Contender Series
Byrd appeared in Dana White's Tuesday Night Contender Series Dana White's Contender Series 1 web-series program on July 11, 2017, facing Jamie Pickett. 
He won the fight via a technical submission in round one but failed to secure a contract with UFC.

Byrd had his second chance at Dana White's Contender Series 6 on August 15, 2017 against Randall Wallace. He won via a submission in round two and with the win, he was signed by UFC.

Ultimate Fighting Championship
Byrd made his UFC debut on March 17, 2018 against John Phillips at UFC Fight Night: Werdum vs. Volkov.
He won the fight via submission with a rear-naked choke in round one.

His next fight came on September 8, 2018 against Darren Stewart at UFC 228. He lost the fight via technical knockout in round two.

Byrd faced Edmen Shahbazyan on March 2, 2019 at UFC 235. He lost the fight via technical knockout in round one.

After a 15-month layoff, Byrd returned to face Maki Pitolo at UFC 250 on June 6, 2020. He lost the bout via second round technical knockout, announcing his retirement after the event.

Mixed martial arts record

|-
|Loss
|align=center|10–7
|Maki Pitolo
|TKO (punches)
|UFC 250
|
|align=center|2
|align=center|1:10
|Las Vegas, Nevada, United States
|
|-
|Loss
|align=center|10–6
|Edmen Shahbazyan
|TKO (elbows and punches)
|UFC 235
|
|align=center|1
|align=center|0:38
|Las Vegas, Nevada, United States
|
|-
|Loss
|align=center|10–5
|Darren Stewart
|TKO (punches and elbows)
|UFC 228
|
|align=center|2
|align=center|2:17
|Dallas, Texas, United States
|
|-
|Win
|align=center|10–4
|John Phillips
|Submission (rear-naked choke)
|UFC Fight Night: Werdum vs. Volkov
|
|align=center|1
|align=center|3:58
|London, England
|
|-
|Win
|align=center|9–4
|Randall Wallace
|Submission (rear-naked choke)
|Dana White's Contender Series 6
|
|align=center|2
|align=center|2:03
|Las Vegas, Nevada, United States
|
|-
|Win
|align=center|8–4
|Jamie Pickett
|Technical Submission (arm-triangle choke)
|Dana White's Contender Series 1
|
|align=center|1
|align=center|4:55
|Las Vegas, Nevada, United States
|
|-
|Win
|align=center|7–4
|Quentin Henry
|TKO (punches)
|Legacy FC 57
|
|align=center|1
|align=center|2:50
|Bossier City, Louisiana, United States
|
|-
|Loss
|align=center|6–4
|Bojan Veličković
|Decision (unanimous)
|AXS TV Fights: RFA vs. Legacy Superfight
|
|align=center|3
|align=center|5:00
|Robinsonville, Mississippi, United States
|
|-
|Win
|align=center|6–3
|Evan Thompson
|TKO (punches)
|Legacy FC 38
|
|align=center|1
|align=center|4:51
|Allen, Texas, United States
|
|-
|Win
|align=center|5–3
|Mike Jasper
|Decision (split)
|Legacy FC 24
|
|align=center|3
|align=center|5:00
|Dallas, Texas, United States
|
|-
|Loss
|align=center|4–3
|Derrick Krantz
|Submission (rear-naked choke)
|Legacy FC 16
|
|align=center|1
|align=center|3:02
|Dallas, Texas, United States
|
|-
|Win
|align=center|4–2
|Ira Boyd
|Submission (arm-triangle choke)
|Dominion Warrior Tri Combat
|
|align=center|1
|align=center|2:11
|Plano, Texas, United States
|
|-
|Win
|align=center|3–2
|Robert Agee
|Decision (unanimous)
|Fight Game: Premier Event
|
|align=center|3
|align=center|3:00
|Frisco, Texas, United States
|
|-
|Win
|align=center|2–2
|Gabriel Vasquez
|Submission (neck crank)
|24/7 Entertainment 2
|
|align=center|1
|align=center|2:15
|Amarillo, Texas, United States
|
|-
|Loss
|align=center|1–2
|Marcelo Azevedo
|Submission (rear-naked choke)
|Legacy Promotions
|
|align=center|1
|align=center|2:04
|Houston, Texas, United States
|
|-
|Win
|align=center|1–1
|Chris Trammel
|TKO (punches)
|KOK 7
|
|align=center|1
|align=center|1:27
|Austin, Texas, United States
|
|-
|Loss
|align=center|0–1
|Donyiell Winrow
|DQ (knee to downed opponent)
|Dominant Knockout 1
|
|align=center|1
|align=center|2:48
|Irving, Texas, United States
|
|-

See also 
 List of male mixed martial artists

References

External links 

 
 

1983 births
Living people
Light heavyweight mixed martial artists
Mixed martial artists utilizing wrestling
Mixed martial artists utilizing Brazilian jiu-jitsu
Sportspeople from Texas
Mixed martial artists from Texas
American male mixed martial artists
American practitioners of Brazilian jiu-jitsu
Ultimate Fighting Championship male fighters